A  (plural ,) is a dumpling eaten as a meal or as a dessert in Germany, Austria, Switzerland, and in France (Alsace-Moselle). It is a typical dish in southern Germany.

History

There are  city gates in Freckenfeld and Kandel, two towns in the Rhineland-Palatinate, in western Germany, very near the border with French Alsace. It is reputed that, during the Thirty Years' War, Swedish troops arrived at Freckenfeld and demanded ransom. Master baker Johannes Muck, with his wife and apprentice, made 1,286  to feed the soldiers, who then spared the village from further extortion and pillage. The  (Dampfnudel gate) even features on the coat of arms of the municipality of Freckenfeld.

Ingredients and preparation
 are made from a dough composed of white flour, water, yeast, salt, butter or margarine, and sometimes also eggs and a little sugar. The dough is formed into balls about the size of an egg, left to rise and then cooked in a covered pot, preferably a high-rimmed iron pan with a lid, either in a mixture of milk and butter (the Bavarian-style) or salt water and fat (the Rhineland-Palatinate style) until a golden-brown crust forms at the bottom after the liquid has evaporated. The tops remain white.

Serving
 are typically served as a main course with savoury accompaniment such as cabbage, salad, gherkins, potato soup, lentil soup, or mushrooms in a béchamel sauce. They can also be served as a dessert with vanilla custard, jam, or boiled fruit. In Bavaria, however,  are traditionally served as the main dish even though they are normally served sweet. In the Palatinate they are served as a main dish and with a salty crust.

See also

 
 
 
 List of buns
 List of desserts
 Siopao
 List of steamed foods
 List of sweet breads

References

Further reading
 

Alsatian cuisine
Palatine cuisine
German cuisine
Ashkenazi Jewish cuisine
Austrian breads
German breads
German desserts
Jewish desserts
Steamed buns
Sweet breads
Yeast breads